Dowgal Station ( – Īstgāh-e Dowgal) is a village and railway station in Rastupey Rural District, in the Central District of Savadkuh County, Mazandaran Province, Iran. At the 2006 census, its population was 16, in 7 families.

References 

Populated places in Savadkuh County
Railway stations in Iran